Stevan "Ćele" Vilotić (Serbian Cyrillic: Стеван "Ћеле" Вилотић; 15 September 1925 – 27 June 1989) was a Yugoslav football manager and player. He managed numerous teams, most notably Partizan and the Yugoslav national team.

References

1925 births
1989 deaths
FK Partizan managers
HNK Rijeka managers
OFK Beograd players
Sportspeople from Šabac
Yugoslav First League players
Yugoslav footballers
Yugoslav football managers
Yugoslavia national football team managers
Association footballers not categorized by position